Mondamon Farm is a historic home and farm complex located near Odessa, New Castle County, Delaware.  The original section was built about 1840. It is a -story, five-bay frame dwelling with a two-bay, two-story shed roof service ell. Also on the property is a frame granary, barn, and 19th-century earthfast hay barrack.

It was listed on the National Register of Historic Places in 1985.

References

External links

Houses on the National Register of Historic Places in Delaware
Farms on the National Register of Historic Places in Delaware
Houses completed in 1840
Houses in New Castle County, Delaware
Historic American Buildings Survey in Delaware
National Register of Historic Places in New Castle County, Delaware